Sharu Naraji (born 7 February 1984) is an Iranian former professional footballer who played as a winger.

Early and personal life
Naraji was born in Bolton, England, and grew up in Iran. He is the older brother of fellow player Shana Haji.

Career

Club career
Naraji began his career with Esteghlal, and spent loan spells in Italy with Torino and in Spain with Real Zaragoza. He signed a one-year contract with English side Sheffield United in August 2005, before signing a contract extension a year later. He was released by United in May 2007, having never made an appearance for them in the Football League. His career was ended by injury.

He was praised by Neil Warnock and former Sheffield United captain Chris Morgan, who compared him with Bayern Munich's Arjen Robben.

International career
After playing with the Iranian under-20 team, Naraji was called up to the senior squad in October 2005. However, due to injury, Naraji was unable to join that squad; injuries also kept him out of the 2006 FIFA World Cup squad.

References

1984 births
Living people
Footballers from Bolton
English footballers
Iranian footballers
Iranian expatriate footballers
Esteghlal F.C. players
Torino F.C. players
Real Zaragoza players
Sheffield United F.C. players
Association football wingers